The History of Java can refer to:

 The history of the island of Java
 The History of Java, an 1817 book on the history of the Java by Stamford Raffles, founder of modern Singapore
 The version history of the Java programming language
 The history of the Java platform

See also
 History of JavaScript
 ECMAScript (JavaScript) version history
 Java (disambiguation)